Union Sportive Municipale de Malakoff is a football team located in Malakoff, France. It is the football section of the parent multi-sport club USM Malakoff. As of the 2020–21 season, the team plays in the Départemental 3, the eleventh tier of French football. The club's colours are blue and red.

History 

USM Malakoff was founded in 1945. The highest tier the club has reached in the French football league system is the Division 2, playing in the division in the 1975–76 season. However, they finished 18th in their group and were relegated. In total, USM Malakoff played 25 seasons of football at national level from 1966 to 1991. In the Coupe de France, the club has reached round of 32 on six occasions.

In November 1953, Malakoff played in a friendly match against the Hungary national team, who were Olympic gold medalists at the time. The event attracted a significant crowd of 10,000 people at the Stade Marcel Cerdan.

Managerial history 

 1949–1969:  Yves Cros
 1969–1970:  
 1970–1979:  Yves Cros
 1979–????:  Yves Fercoq
 2019–????: Nouar Hassani

Honours

Notable former players 

  Pierre Aubameyang
  Robert Blanc
  Gilles Bocq
  Marc Collat
  Patrick Grappin
  Maxen Kapo
  Paul Moukila

Notes

References

External links 
 Club website

1945 establishments in France
Association football clubs established in 1945
Sport in Hauts-de-Seine
Football clubs in Paris